Carter County is a county located in the U.S. state of Tennessee. As of the 2020 census, the population was 56,356. Its county seat is Elizabethton. The county is named in honor of Landon Carter (1760-1800), an early settler active in the "Lost State of Franklin" 1784-1788 secession from the State of North Carolina. Carter County is part of the Johnson City, TN Metropolitan Statistical Area, which is a component of the Johnson City–Kingsport–Bristol, TN-VA Combined Statistical Area, located in northeastern Tennessee.

History

The area was originally claimed by Britain as part of the Clarendon settlements of the Province of Carolina, although actually populated at the time by the Cherokee.

The area was part of (though seldom actually administered by) the following jurisdictions in its early history:
New Hanover Precinct (1729-1734)
Bladen County (1734-1749)
Anson County (1749-1753)
Rowan County (1753-1775)

Watauga Association
The county is named for General Landon Carter, the son of John Carter of Virginia, who was "chairman of the court" of the first majority-rule system of American democracy, known as the Watauga Association of 1772. The association was the first permanent settlement established outside the original thirteen American colonies and included the area that is today's Carter County.  In 1775, the Association was absorbed into North Carolina by petition, becoming known thereafter as the Washington District.

As Wayne County in the State of Franklin
This new county covered the same territory now embraced in the limits of Carter and Johnson counties."

The county seat, Elizabethton, is named for Carter's wife, Elizabeth MacLin Carter.

Civil War
Like most East Tennessee counties, Carter Countians opposed secession on the eve of the Civil War.  In Tennessee's Ordinance of Secession referendum on June 8, 1861, Carter Countians rejected secession by a vote of 1,343 to 86.  A railroad bridge at Carter's Depot (modern Watauga) was among those targeted by the East Tennessee bridge-burning conspiracy in November 1861.

Early railroad
Carter County was served by the narrow gauge East Tennessee and Western North Carolina Railroad (The ET&WNC, nicknamed "Tweetsie") until the line ceased operations in 1950.

Geography

Carter County is situated entirely within the Blue Ridge Mountains, specifically the Unaka Range and the Iron Mountains. The county's boundary with Sullivan County is defined as the ridgeline of Holston Mountain.

Lakes
Watauga Lake
Wilbur Reservoir (immediately below the TVA Watauga Dam Lat: 36.3408 Lon: -82.1203]
Ripshin Lake (6 km southwest of Roan Mountain Lat: 36.1838646 Lon: -82.1356583)

Rivers
Watauga River
Doe River

Waterfalls

Adjacent counties
Sullivan County (north)
Johnson County (northeast)
Avery County, North Carolina (southeast)
Mitchell County, North Carolina (south)
Unicoi County (southwest)
Washington County (west)

National protected areas
Appalachian Trail (part)
Cherokee National Forest (part)

State protected areas
Hampton Creek Cove State Natural Area
Roan Mountain State Park
Sabine Hill State Historic Site
Sycamore Shoals State Historic Area
Watauga River Bluffs State Natural Area

Major highways

Law enforcement
Carter County is served by the Carter County Sheriff's Office, located in Elizabethton. During the Local General Election on August 4, 2022, Mike Fraley overcame the Independent candidate to become Sheriff of Carter County. Sheriff Fraley took over Official Duties as Sheriff on September 1. Sheriff Fraley's term will run September 1, 2022 to August 31, 2026. Its duties include patrol of the county and all jail and prisoner matters.

The Elizabethton Police Department services the City of Elizabethton inside Carter County. As of 2018, the Chief of Police is Jason Shaw.

Climate

Demographics

2020 census

As of the 2020 United States census, there were 56,356 people, 23,784 households, and 15,256 families residing in the county.

2000 census
As of the census of 2000, there were 56,742 people, 23,486 households, and 16,346 families residing in the county.  The population density was 166 people per square mile (64/km2).  There were 25,920 housing units at an average density of 76 per square mile (29/km2).  The racial makeup of the county was 97.49% White, 1.00% Black or African American, 0.20% Native American, 0.26% Asian, 0.01% Pacific Islander, 0.27% from other races, and 0.78% from two or more races.  0.89% of the population were Hispanic or Latino of any race.

There were 23,486 households, out of which 28.50% had children under the age of 18 living with them, 54.90% were married couples living together, 11.00% had a female householder with no husband present, and 30.40% were non-families. 26.50% of all households were made up of individuals, and 11.00% had someone living alone who was 65 years of age or older.  The average household size was 2.35 and the average family size was 2.83.

In the county, the population was spread out, with 21.40% under the age of 18, 9.20% from 18 to 24, 29.00% from 25 to 44, 25.40% from 45 to 64, and 15.00% who were 65 years of age or older.  The median age was 38 years. For every 100 females, there were 94.50 males.  For every 100 females age 18 and over, there were 91.60 males.

The median income for a household in the county was $27,371, and the median income for a family was $33,825. Males had a median income of $26,394 versus $19,687 for females. The per capita income for the county was $14,678.  About 12.80% of families and 16.90% of the population were below the poverty line, including 23.00% of those under age 18 and 16.00% of those age 65 or over.

Education

Colleges
Northeast State Community College and the Tennessee Colleges of Applied Technology have satellite campuses in Elizabethton.
Milligan College's main campus and Emmanuel Christian Seminary are located in the community of Milligan College, part of Elizabethton.

Communities

Cities
Elizabethton (county seat)
Johnson City (mostly in Washington County and a small portion in Sullivan County)
Watauga (small part in Washington County)

Census-designated places

Biltmore
Central
Hampton
Hunter
Pine Crest
Roan Mountain
Valley Forge

Other unincorporated communities

 Big Spring
 Bitter End
 Butler
 Carter
 Fish Springs
 Laurel Fork
 Milligan College
 Stoney Creek
 Tiger Valley
 Winner

Politics
Carter County is a Republican stronghold, and, like most of East Tennessee, has voted consistently Republican since the Civil War. Carter County is even more heavily Republican than many other counties in East Tennessee and has not been won by a Democratic Presidential candidate since before the Civil War. Since then, only one Democrat, southerner Jimmy Carter in 1976 (who also won several traditionally Republican counties in East Tennessee), has received over 40% of the popular vote.

Most recent Carter County Mayor Rusty Barnett died on September 21, 2020.

See also
National Register of Historic Places listings in Carter County, Tennessee
List of counties in Tennessee

References

External links

 Official site
 Elizabethton-Carter County Chamber of Commerce
 Carter County Tomorrow
 Carter County History.com
 Carter County, TNGenWeb - free genealogy resources for the county
 Carter County  Landforms
 Cy Crumley ET&WNC Photo Collection
Carter County Sheriff's Department

 
1796 establishments in Tennessee
Populated places established in 1796
Johnson City metropolitan area, Tennessee
Counties of Appalachia
Second Amendment sanctuaries in Tennessee
East Tennessee